Ohio gained eight seats in reapportionment following the 1820 United States Census. Ohio elected its members October 8, 1822.

See also 
 1822 and 1823 United States House of Representatives elections
 List of United States representatives from Ohio

Notes 

1822
Ohio
United States House of Representatives